Congregation B'nai Israel (Hebrew: בני ישראל) is a Conservative Egalitarian Jewish congregation located in downtown St. Catharines, Ontario, Canada. It is the only Conservative synagogue in the Niagara Region. Founded early in the 20th century, its 1905 synagogue building is among the oldest still standing in Canada.

Rabbi Moshe Meirovich started leading the community in September 2019.

External links
 Congregation B'nai Israel website

Synagogues completed in 1905
Buildings and structures in St. Catharines
Conservative synagogues in Canada
Synagogues in Ontario
1905 establishments in Ontario
20th-century religious buildings and structures in Canada